Che, Ché, Chè or CHE may refer to:

People
 Che (surname) (车), Chinese surname
 Ché Ahn, (born 1956), American Christian pastor
 Che Guevara (1928–1967), Argentine Marxist revolutionary
 Che Lovelace (born 1969), Trinidadian artist

Arts and entertainment
 Che!, a 1969 film by Richard Fleischer about Che Guevara
 What? (film) or Che?, a 1972 film by Roman Polanski
 Che (2008 film), a 2008 film directed by Steven Soderbergh starring Benicio del Toro
 Che (2014 film), a 2014 Persian film
 Ché (band), an American stoner rock band
 Che, the narrator in Andrew Lloyd Webber's musical Evita
 Che, from the television show The O.C.
 Che, the rebranded name of Russian federal television channel Peretz

Education
 Centre for Higher Education, German organization dedicated to higher education reform
 Cherry Hill High School East, a public high school in Cherry Hill, New Jersey
 Christelijke Hogeschool Ede, a Dutch Christian vocational university
 UPLB College of Human Ecology, in the Philippines

Language
 Che (Cyrillic), a letter of the Cyrillic alphabet
 Che (Persian), a letter of the Persian alphabet
 Che (Spanish), a Spanish interjection
 Che language
 Chechen language (ISO 639: che)

Country, station, and currency codes
 CHE currency code by ISO 4217, a Swiss WIR Bank fund
 Cheam railway station (station code: CHE), England National Rail station
 Chestwood stop (MTR station code: CHE),  Tin Shui Wai, Hong Kong
 The ISO 3166-1 alpha-3 international country code for Switzerland
 Zhejiang, a Chinese province

Sports
 Chelsea F.C. (Che)
 Valencia CF or "Los Che", a Spanish football club

Other uses
 Chè, a sweet dessert soup or pudding in Vietnamese cuisine
 ARC Centre of Excellence for the History of Emotions
 Campaign for Homosexual Equality
 Certified Health Executive, a professional health leadership designation in Canada
 Certified Hospitality Educator, a certification awarded by the American Hotel & Lodging Educational Institute
 Chemical engineering (ChE)
 Cholinesterase (ChE), a family of enzymes
 The Chronicle of Higher Education, an American periodical
 Container Handling Equipment, machinery used in Containerization
 District Health Board, previously Crown Health Enterprise, in New Zealand
 Maclura tricuspidata or Che, a fruit-bearing tree

See also
Shay (disambiguation)
Shea (disambiguation)